The Champollion Museum is located in Figeac, Lot.

It houses a collection devoted to Figeac's most famous son, Jean-François Champollion.

It was inaugurated 19 December 1986 in the presence of President François Mitterrand and Jean Leclant, secrétaire perpétuel of the Académie des Inscriptions et Belles-Lettres.  After two years of building work and extension, the museum re-opened in 2007. Besides Champollion's life and discoveries, the museum also recounts the history of writing.  The whole façade is covered in pictograms, from the original ideograms of the whole world.

History 
In 1986, thanks to the efforts of the city of Figeac, the first museum dedicated to Jean-François Champollion, known for deciphering Egyptian hieroglyphs, was opened.

In 2014, the museum consecrated an exhibition to the explorations of Théodore Ber, also a native of Figeac, 40 ans dans les andes: L'itinéraire oublié de Théodore Ber (1820–1900), and published an illustrated catalog.

The museum was then installed in the house where the Egyptologist was born, which was thus saved from destruction and restored. This house has been listed as a historical monument since 1973. 

In 1991, the city celebrated the bicentenary of the birth of Figeac de Champollion by creating the Place des Scriptures, located just behind the museum. In August 1999, the city began a program to renovate and extend the museum. Work began on October 3, 2005. More than four million euros were financed by Europe (29.84%), the State (22.34%), the region (25%), the department (2 .43%) and the town of Figeac (20.39%). The architect Alain Moatti was responsible for the design of the project.

The new Champollion museum, renamed Les Ecritures du Monde, opened its doors on July 28, 2007. Its facade with 1,000 letters, made of stone, glass and metal, allows access to the museum via Place Champollion. The graphic designer Pierre di Sciullo has drawn hieroglyphs and other writing signs from around the world on large openwork copper sheets.

The museum's collections recount the fabulous adventure of writing, which appeared in different parts of the world 5,300 years ago for the oldest. From Mexico to China via Mesopotamia, objects inscribed with a brush, reed pen or pen tell how man invented, adapted or made his writing travel.

The museum extends over four levels and eight rooms, it is fully accessible to the disabled, with the exception of the loggias which, at each level, allow a closer observation of the facade with a thousand letters and offer a beautiful point of view. on the town and Place Champollion, restored in 2008.

In addition to the permanent collection accessible all year round which brings together more than 600 objects or documents, the museum regularly offers meetings for all audiences (readings, conferences, concerts, screenings, etc.) and temporary exhibitions which allow you to explore the one of the civilizations covered in the permanent collections.

Bibliography 
 Van Uffelen, Chris. Contemporary Museums – Architecture, History, Collections, Braun Publishing, 2010, pages 190–193.

References

External links 

Archaeological museums in France
Museums in Lot (department)
Museums established in 1986
1986 establishments in France
Maisons des Illustres